Enallagma durum, the big bluet, is a species of narrow-winged damselfly in the family Coenagrionidae. It is found in northern Mexico and southern and eastern United States.

The IUCN conservation status of Enallagma durum is "least concern", with no immediate threat to the species' survival. The population is stable.

References

Further reading

External links

 

Coenagrionidae
Articles created by Qbugbot
Insects described in 1861
Odonata of North America
Insects of Mexico
Insects of the United States
Taxa named by Hermann August Hagen